The Minister for the Suburban Rail Loop is a minister within the Cabinet of Victoria tasked with overseeing the construction of the Suburban Rail Loop, and the operations of the Suburban Rail Loop Authority.

A number of acts of parliament give the minister executive powers relevant to the portfolio, these include the Development Victoria Act 2003, Suburban Rail Loop Act 2021, and the Victorian Planning Authority Act 2017.

Ministers

Reference list  

Victoria State Government
Ministers of the Victoria (Australia) state government